Club Deportivo Guadalajara Premier played in the Liga Premier in Guadalajara, Jalisco, Mexico and were the official reserve team for C.D. Guadalajara. The games were held in the city of Guadalajara in the Verde Valle training fields. It replaced C.D. Tapatío as the official reserve team in 2009 under the name Chivas Rayadas. In 2015 it was renamed Guadalajara Premier. The roster is composed of the club's talented youth academy players, some of which outgrew the age of 20. The Team ended on May 15, 2019 with all players leaving the team

Current squad

Honors
 Liga Premier de Ascenso de México (1): Revolución 2011.
 Copa de la Segunda División de México (3): 1995-96, Apertura 2013, Clausura 2014.
 Campeón de Campeones: 2014.
 Tercera División de México: 1993-94

References

External links
 First Team Squad Official Website 
 Mexican Football League Second Division Official Website 

Football clubs in Jalisco
Association football clubs established in 1906
Football clubs in Guadalajara, Jalisco
 
1906 establishments in Mexico
Liga Premier de México